Nellaiappar Temple corridor is a Hindu temple dedicated to the deity Shiva, located in Tirunelveli, a city in the South Indian state of Tamil Nadu. Shiva is worshipped as Nellaiappar (also called Venuvananathar) represented by the lingam and his consort Parvati is depicted as Kanthimathi Amman. The temple is located on the northern banks of Thamirabarani River in Tirunelveli district. The presiding deity is revered in the 7th century Tamil Saiva canonical work, the Tevaram, written by Tamil saint poets known as the nayanmars and classified as Paadal Petra Sthalam.

The temple complex covers an area of fourteen and a half acres and all its shrines are enclosed with concentric rectangular walls. The temple has a number of shrines, with those of Swamy Nellaiappar and his consort Sri Kanthimathi Ambal being the most prominent.

The temple has three six rituals at various times from 6:00 a.m. to 9:00 p.m., and six yearly festivals on its calendar. Brahmotsavam festival during the Tamil month of Aani (June–July) is the most prominent festival celebrated in the temple.

The original complex is believed to have been built by Pandyas, while the present masonry structure was added by Cholas, Pallavas, Cheras, and Madurai Nayaks. In modern times, the temple is maintained and adminIstered by the Hindu Religious and Charitable Endowments Department of the Government of Tamil Nadu.

History 

Tirunelveli is one of the many temple towns in the state which is named after the groves, clusters or forests dominated by a particular variety of a tree or shrub and the same variety of tree or shrub sheltering the presiding deity. The region is believed to have been covered with Venu forest and hence called Venuvanam.

The original complex is believed to have been built by Pandyas, while the present masonry structure was added by Cholas, Pallavas, Cheras, and Madurai Nayaks.  The sanctums of the temple and the gopurams were constructed by Nindraseer Nedumaran (Koon Pandian) who reigned in the 7th century AD. The mani mandapam with its famous musical pillar was also likely built by Nindraseer Nedumaran. The flag stand near the Nandi was set up in 1155. Later Pandya, Kulasekara Pandyan I built the outer wall of the Thirunelveli Nellaiappar temple, in 13th century.

Originally, the Nellaiappar and Kanthimathi temples were two independent structures with spaces in between. It was in 1647 that Thiru Vadamalaiappa Pillaiyan, a great devotee of Siva linked the two temples by building the "Chain mandapam" (In Tamil Sangili Mandapam). In the centre of the Flower Garden is a square vasantha mandapam with 100 pillars. The Nandi mandapam is said to have been built by Sivanthiappa Nayakar in 1654. To the western portion of the chain mandapam is the flower garden that was set up in 1756 by Thiruvengadakrishna Mudaliar.
 
There are a number of stone inscriptions in the temple. The most important of them are those Veerapandiyan who reigned around 950 AD and those of Rajendran I and Kulothunga Chola I. The inscriptions of Maravarman Sundara Pandyan refer to the Lord as "Woodayar" and "Wodeyanayanar" and the Goddess as "Nachiar". From the inscriptions of Kulasekkara Pandiyan we learn that he defeated the Chera, Chola and Hoysala kings and built the outer walls of the temple with the war booty.

Legend
Tirunelveli was originally called Tinnevelly during the British Era. During Puranic times, the place was called Venuvana, a forest of bamboos. The deity in the current temple was believed have appeared inside the bamboo forest. Vishnu is believed to have witnessed the marriage between Shiva and Parvathi at this place. There is an image of Vishnu with a metallic Gindi, a vessel with a spout, in the temple depicting the legend.

Architecture

Sangili Mandapam built on 1647 by vadamalaiyappa pillayan connects the Ganthimathi Amman and Nellaiyappar temples. The temple has a number of shrines, with those of Swamy Nellaiappar and his consort Sri Kanthimathi Ambal being the most prominent.

The Nandi mandapam has a fairly big statue of Nandi (the bull God), similar to those at Tanjore and Rameswaram . The unique feature of the temple is the 'Mani manadapam' located near the nandi mandapam with two giant pillars carved out of a single stone and each one is having 48 sub pillars which produce musical notes when struck. Tamil poet says that the pillars here are a combination of the Shruti Gana Laya types. Other mandapams in the temple include Oonjal Mandapam and the 1000 pillared hall.

The composite columns of Virabhadra holding sword and horn are found be additions of the Vijayanayagara kings during the early 1500s. Similar columns of Virabhadra are found in Adikesava Perumal Temple at Thiruvattaru, Meenakshi Temple at Madurai, Kasi Viswanathar temple at Tenkasi, Krishnapuram Venkatachalapathy temple, Ramanathaswamy Temple at Rameswaram, Soundararajaperumal temple at Thadikombu, Srivilliputhur Andal temple, Srivaikuntanathan Permual temple at Srivaikuntam, Avudayarkovil, Vaishnava Nambi and Thirukurungudivalli Nachiar temple at Thirukkurungudi.

Thaamira Ambalam
Tirunelveli also is one of the five places where Lord Shiva is said to have displayed his dance and all these places have stages/ ambalams. While Tirunelveli has the Thaamira (Copper) Ambalam or Thamira Sabhai , the others are the Rathina Ambalam/ Rathna Sabhai  at Thiruvaalangadu (rathinam – ruby / red), the Chitra Ambalam or Chitra Sabhai at Courtallam (chitra – painting), the Velli Ambalam or Rajatha Sabhai at Madurai Meenakshi Amman Temple (velli – silver) and the Pon (Gold) Ambalam or PorSabhai at Thillai Nataraja Temple, Chidambaram.

Pancha Sabhai Sthalangal 

The temples where Shiva is believed to have performed the Cosmic Dance. This temple is called Tambra Sabha (copper hall) based on the dance pose of Nataraja. There are several architectural depictions in the temple detailing the legends.

Religious importance and festivals

Navaratri, Tirukkalyanam in Aippasi, (15 October – 15 November) and Arudra Darisanam are some of the important festivals here. Arudra Darisanam attracts huge crowds here.  The temple chariot is a massive one, second supposedly only to Tiruvarur.  The Bhrammotsavam here lasts for an extended period of time during the Tamil month of Aani (15 June – 15 July).  Also, a golden temple car (First Inaugural run of Nellaiappar Temple Golden Car is 2 November 2009) will run during important festivals like Thirukalyanam, Kaarthigai, Aaruthra Festival etc.  During Thaipoosam festival in Thai, Lord Shiva and Parvathy are taken to the banks of Thamirabarani river in Tirunelveli junction called "Thaipoosa mandapam".  Special rituals are undertaken there and the Lord return to the temple at night. Nellaiappar Temple car is the third largest car in Tamil Nadu.And it is the first car to be driven fully automatically.

The temple priests perform the puja (rituals) during festivals and on a daily basis. The temple rituals are performed Six times a day; Thiruvananthal at 5.15 a.m Ushatkalapooja at 6.00a.m Sirukalasanthi at 7.00a.m Kalasanthi at 8:00 a.m., Uchikalam at 12:00 a.m. and Sayarakshai at 6:00 p.m. Arthajamam at 8.30 p.m Palliarai at 9.15 p.m Bhairavar Poojai at 9.30 p.m Each ritual comprises four steps: abhisheka (sacred bath), alangaram (decoration), naivethanam (food offering) and deepa aradanai (waving of lamps) for Nelliappar and Kanthimathi Amman. The Thai Aaratu festival during the Tamil month of Thai (January - February) is the most important festivals of the temple.

Literary mention
Tirugnana Sambandar and Appar, the 7th-century Tamil Saivite poet Nayanmars, venerated Nelliappar in ten verses in Tevaram, compiled as the First Tirumurai. Sundarar, an 8th-century nayanmar, also venerated Idaiyatreeswarar in ten verses in Tevaram, compiled as the Fifth Tirumurai. As the temple is revered in Tevaram, it is classified as Paadal Petra Sthalam, one of the 276 temples that find mention in the Saiva canon.
Muthuswami Dikshitar composed one song (Sri Kantimatim) on this temple goddess Kanthimathi Amman.This song is considered to be a rare song set in the rare raga Hemavathi.

References

External links

 Nellaiappar Temple official site
 Nellaiappar Temple at Tirunelveli
 Nellaiappar Temple, Tirunelveli
 

 

Hindu temples in Tirunelveli district
Padal Petra Stalam
Tirunelveli
Pancha Sabhai
7th-century establishments in India
7th-century Hindu temples
Shiva temples in Tirunelveli district
Pandyan Empire
Pandyan architecture
Pandyan dynasty